Rosedale Field was a grandstand stadium located in Rosedale Park at 20 Scholfield Avenue, Toronto, Ontario, Canada.

Originally called Toronto Lacrosse Grounds, it was linked to St. Andrew's College located in the area west of MacLennan Avenue from Summerhill Avenue to Douglas Drive (now a residential area).

It could seat 4,000 spectators and could accommodate upwards of 10,000 standing. It was home to the Toronto Argonauts from 1874 to 1877, Toronto Football Club/Toronto Athletic Club  1879–1897 and again from 1908 to 1915. It hosted the  Canadian Dominion Football Championship game in 1892, 1894, 1896, 1900, 1905 and 1908. It is most famously known for hosting the first ever Grey Cup game in 1909 when almost 4,000 fans witnessed the University of Toronto Varsity Blues defeat Toronto Parkdale by a score of 26–6.

The 3,400 seat stadium and field was originally owned by the Rosedale Golf Club (which lent its name to the park). The grandstand is no longer standing; however, the field is still there and is used for soccer. The namesake golf course moved out in 1909 as The Scottish Ontario and Manitoba Land Company re-developed the area for residential homes.

The current field is part of Rosedale Park, owned by the City of Toronto. The home of Rosedale Tennis Club is located in the northern portion of the park. An outdoor skating rink, two sets of tennis courts, a playground, wading pool, and a baseball field are also available in the park. Mooredale House uses the park for a soccer league and baseball league as well as a hockey league.

The field is also home to the annual spring park party, Mayfair. The event typically consists of rides, games, flea market and other such carnival-type activities. The event is traditionally on the first Saturday in May. The event is run and funded by Mooredale House. Celebrations surrounding the 100th Grey Cup in 2012 began with the unveiling of a Heritage Toronto commemorative plaque at Rosedale Park.

See also

 Centennial Park Stadium - City of Toronto
 Esther Shiner Stadium - City of Toronto
 Lamport Stadium - City of Toronto
 Monarch Park Stadium - Toronto District School Board
 Metro Toronto Track and Field Centre - City of Toronto
 Varsity Stadium - University of Toronto
 York Lions Stadium - York University

References

External links
 
 Rosedale Park
 Mooredale House

Canadian Football League venues
Defunct Canadian football venues
Defunct sports venues in Toronto
Toronto Argonauts
Parks in Toronto
Rosedale, Toronto
Sports venues completed in 1874
1874 establishments in Ontario
Lacrosse venues in Canada
Soccer venues in Ontario
Canadian football venues in Ontario